This article details the squads that will participate in the Columbus Regional of the 2021 edition of The Basketball Tournament.

Squads

No. 1 Carmen's Crew

No. 2 Red Scare

No. 3 Zip 'em Up

No. 4 Team Hines

No. 5 The Money Team

No. 6 Blue Collar U

No. 7 Wolf Blood

No. 8 Men of Mackey

No. 9 Ballinteers

No. 10 Category 5

No. 11 The Nerd Team

No. 12 The Region

No. 13 Brown & White

No. 14 Ohio 1804

No. 15 BC Vahakni City

No. 16 Mid-American Unity

References

The Basketball Tournament